Maria Adler (born 28 May 1992) is a retired Swedish handball player for the Swedish national team. Her last club was RK Krim.

References

1992 births
Living people
Swedish female handball players
Sportspeople from Lund
21st-century Swedish women